The Sky Seeker Powerchutes Sky Seeker is a Canadian powered parachute that was designed and produced by Sky Seeker Powerchutes of Woking, Alberta, introduced in 2000.

Design and development
The Sky Seeker was designed as a quick-built kit with a construction time of 6–12 hours for the Canadian basic ultralight category and the US FAR 103 Ultralight Vehicles two-seat trainer rules. It features a  parachute-style high-wing, two-seats-in-tandem, tricycle landing gear and a single  Rotax 503 engine in pusher configuration.

The aircraft is built from tubing and features a fibreglass cockpit fairing for cool-weather flying. The main landing gear incorporates spring rod suspension.

Specifications (Sky Seeker)

References

2000s Canadian ultralight aircraft
Single-engined pusher aircraft
Powered parachutes